Antennularia is a genus of fungi in the family Venturiaceae.

References

External links
Antennularia at Index Fungorum

Venturiaceae
Taxa named by Ludwig Reichenbach